Ames is a town in southeastern Major County, Oklahoma, United States.  The population was 239 at the 2010 census. This was a 20.1 percent increase from the figure of 199 in 2000.

Ames is best known for being located within the boundary of a geological structure that is called the Ames crater or the Ames Astrobleme. The Ames Astrobleme Museum is located in the town.

History
Ames was founded at the opening of the Cherokee Outlet on September 16, 1893. It was initially named Hoyle, for a nearby creek. The Blackwell, Enid and Southwestern Railroad (later the St. Louis and San Francisco Railway) constructed a line from Blackwell in Kay County to Darrow in Blaine County, that passed through the community. On January 4, 1902, it was named for Henry S. Ames, a railroad official.

Ames had a population of 278 at the 1920 census and 332 at the 1940 census, its peak population.

Oil was discovered within the Ames crater in 1991.

Geography
Ames is located at  (36.246619, -98.186740). It is about 93 miles from Oklahoma City, 27 miles from Enid and 22 miles from Fairview (driving distances).

Annual events
Every year in the month of August, the town celebrates Ames Day, both to commemorate the founding of the town and to raise funds for the town's volunteer fire department.  Ames Day celebrations have been known to include parades, golf tournaments, pie auctions, turtle races, greased pig chases, mutton busting competitions, chicken roping, cow patty bingo, tug of war competitions, baseball games, beard-growing contests, and husband-calling competitions.  Weather permitting, the celebrations culminate each year in a huge and fantastic fireworks celebration.

Ames Astrobleme Museum
The Ames Astrobleme Museum, which opened August 18, 2007, features numerous image panels and a video showing the formation of the Ames crater and its discovery as a significant geological and economic resource.  The crater was caused by a meteor striking the area 450 million years ago. There is sediment two miles deep covering the crater, and the town of Ames approximately is located in the middle of the crater. The crater is eight miles in diameter and is similar to craters on the moon. It is one of the few oil-producing craters in the world. Cumulative production figures through the end of 2006 show production in the Ames crater area approaching 11 million barrels.

Demographics

As of the census of 2010, there were 239 people living in the town.  The population density was 800 people per square mile (300/km2). There were 111 housing units at an average density of 373 per square mile (146/km2).  The racial makeup of the town was 97.99% White, 2.01% from other races. Hispanic or Latino of any race were 4.52% of the population.

There were 91 households, out of which 23.1% had children under the age of 18 living with them, 57.1% were married couples living together, 7.7% had a female householder with no husband present, and 31.9% were non-families. 30.8% of all households were made up of individuals, and 19.8% had someone living alone who was 65 years of age or older. The average household size was 2.19 and the average family size was 2.69.

In the town, the population was spread out, with 21.1% under the age of 18, 5.0% from 18 to 24, 25.1% from 25 to 44, 25.6% from 45 to 64, and 23.1% who were 65 years of age or older. The median age was 44 years. For every 100 females, there were 97.0 males. For every 100 females age 18 and over, there were 91.5 males.

The median income for a household in the town was $26,563, and the median income for a family was $33,438. Males had a median income of $26,563 versus $18,750 for females. The per capita income for the town was $12,566. About 19.7% of families and 22.9% of the population were below the poverty line, including 46.9% of those under the age of eighteen and 14.0% of those 65 or over.

References

External links
 Encyclopedia of Oklahoma History and Culture - Ames
 Oklahoma Digital Maps: Digital Collections of Oklahoma and Indian Territory

Towns in Major County, Oklahoma
Towns in Oklahoma